Matt Donovan  is a Russian international rugby league footballer who represented  at the 2000 Rugby League World Cup.

Career
Donovan, of Russian descent, represented  at the 2000 Rugby League World Cup.

References

1980s births
Place of birth missing (living people)

Year of birth uncertain
Living people
Australian rugby league players
Australian people of Russian descent
Russia national rugby league team players
Rugby league wingers
Rugby league centres